Thudiyalur is a neighborhood in the city of Coimbatore, in the Indian state of Tamil Nadu. Thudiyalur is one of the fast-growing neighbourhoods of Coimbatore, due to the presence of many industries and IT companies in Saravanampatti. Earlier, this place was known as Thiruthudisaiampathy, later it was named Thudiyalur.

It houses the Regional Transport Office of Coimbatore North (TN-38).

Thiruthudisaiampathy Virundeeswarar Temple in Vadamadurai near Thudiyalur is construction dating back to 1300+ years old ancient temple. Lord Shiva is a Swayambumurthi in the temple.

Demographics 
As per 2011 India census, the population was 33,924. Females constitute 51% and males 49% of the population. Thudiyalur has an average literacy rate of 75%, higher than the national average of 59.5%: male literacy is 82%, and female literacy is 69%.  10% of the population is under 6.

Thudiyalur railway station
 
In 2017 the railway station was refurbished. Thudiyalur railway station is on the Coimbatore - Mettupalayam section. This station handles local passenger trains between Mettupalayam railway station and Coimbatore Junction. It just takes 15 minutes to reach Coimbatore Junction and 25 minutes to reach Mettupalayam railway station from Thudiyalur railway station and fare is also just Rs.10 in both directions.

Government offices
Regional Transport Office-Coimbatore North
Coimbatore Municipal Corporation- Collection office [North Zone]
 District Employment Office, GN Mills, Coimbatore
 Government Library, Thudiyalur

References 

Neighbourhoods in Coimbatore